The XOD Class Keelboat (X (Class) One Design (XOD) keelboat) is a small 21 ft day racing yacht with fleets based on the south coast of England.

The XOD Class is unique in having six active fleets around the Solent area, between Chichester Harbour in the East and Poole Harbour in the West. In each of the locations a well-established local Club manages the racing. Seasons and race programmes vary to meet the requirements of the local membership.

The X One Design was designed by Alfred Westmacott, who was Managing Director of Woodnutts Boatyard at St Helens on the Isle of Wight. He specialised in building small day racing boats and these included the Seaview Mermaid, Solent Sunbeam and Victory.  Racing first took place in Southampton Water in 1911 under the auspices of the MYC (later to become the Royal Motor Yacht Club). By the outbreak of the First World War some ten boats had been built.  After the First World War, building resumed in 1923, continued till 1939, stopped during WW2 and resumed in 1946. The latest boat built was as recently as 2007.  The hull shape has remained unchanged since the original design but there have been changes to the approved types of timber, fastenings and surface treatments. This last change was perhaps the most important, as many boats have now been epoxied with considerable savings in upkeep and prolonging the life of the boats so treated.

X One Design racing takes place throughout the season in six locations around the Solent. At each one a full programme of racing is organised by the Clubs involved.  Of the 202 X boats ever built, after allowing for those lost to fire, storm, neglect and one even to enemy action, there are still 190 registered.  XOD fleets are in Cowes, Hamble, Itchenor, Lymington, Parkstone and Yarmouth.

An XOD is usually crewed competitively by three people, although it is possible to sail with two. The spinnaker can be hoisted without the crew leaving the cockpit.

The XOD fleet is an important part of Cowes Week one of the longest-running regular regattas in the world.  XOD's were first raced in August 1911. 2011 marked the Centenary year with an unprecedented 145 entries in Cowes Week.  The X Class continues to hold a special place in the event with over 80 yachts racing in the 2014 Cowes Week regatta.  This regatta included a yacht originally built over a century ago in 1911 named Madcap - sail number X5.

The oldest XOD - X1 Mistletoe belongs to The National Maritime Museum of Greenwich, London. It is on display in Cowes, Isle of Wight at the  Classic Boat Museum.

XOD Fleet

References

External links
 X One Design Class Association

Keelboats
One-design sailing classes